Jimmy Amadie (January 5, 1937 – December 10, 2013) was a jazz pianist and educator from Philadelphia. He worked with Woody Herman and Mel Tormé. In 1960, his career as a musician was hindered by tendonitis. Surgery in the 1990s allowed him to return to the piano. In 1995 he released his first solo album, Always with Me. He died of lung cancer on December 10, 2013 at the age of 76.

Books

Discography
 1995 Always with Me (TP)
 1997 Savoring Every Note (TP)
 2002 In a Trio Setting: A Tribute to Frank Sinatra (TP)
 2003 Live at Red Rock Studio: A Tribute to Tony Bennett (TP)
 2006 Let's Groove! (TP)
 2007 The Philadelphia Story (TP)
 2011 Something Special (TP)
 2013 Live at Philadelphia Museum of Art (TP)

References

External links
 Official site

1937 births
2013 deaths
Mainstream jazz pianists
Bebop pianists
Swing pianists
American jazz musicians
Musicians from Philadelphia
20th-century American pianists
Jazz musicians from Pennsylvania
American male pianists
20th-century American male musicians
American male jazz musicians